Red Thunder may refer to:

45th Fires Brigade (United States), nicknamed Red Thunder
Red Thunder, chief of the Yanktonai Dakotas and father of Wanata
Red Thunder (musical group), a rock band formed in 1990 with Native American influences
Tonnere Rouge (Red Thunder, or Wuckiew Nutch) chief of the Sussitongs of the Lac de la Grosse Roche
Red Thunder (novel), a 2003 science fiction novel by John Varley
Red Thunder Cloud, last native speaker of the Catawba Indian language
Clint Frazier, an American professional baseball outfielder nicknamed "Red Thunder"